James Edgar Till  (born August 25, 1931) is a University of Toronto biophysicist, best known for demonstrating – with Ernest McCulloch – the existence of stem cells.

Early work
Till was born in Lloydminster, which is located on the border between Saskatchewan and Alberta. The family farm was located north of Lloydminster, in Alberta; the eastern margin of the farm was the Alberta–Saskatchewan boundary.

He attended the University of Saskatchewan with scholarships awarded by the Standard Oil Company and the National Research Council, graduating with a B.Sc. in 1952 and a M.Sc. in physics in 1954. Some of his early work was conducted with Harold E. Johns, a pioneer in cobalt-60 radiotherapy. Till proceeded to Yale University, where he received a Ph.D. in biophysics in 1957. He then became a post-doctoral fellow at the University of Toronto.

Stem cells
Harold E. Johns recruited Till to the Ontario Cancer Institute at Princess Margaret Hospital shortly after he completed his work at Yale.  Subsequently, Till chose to work with Ernest McCulloch at the University of Toronto. Thus, the older physician's insight was combined with the younger physicist's rigorous and thorough nature.

In the early 1960s, McCulloch and Till started a series of experiments that involved injecting bone marrow cells into irradiated mice.  They observed that small raised lumps grew on the spleens of the mice, in proportion to the number of bone marrow cells injected.  Till and McCulloch dubbed the lumps 'spleen colonies', and speculated that each lump arose from a single marrow cell: perhaps a stem cell.

In later work, Till & McCulloch were joined by graduate student Andy Becker.  They cemented their stem cell theory and in 1963 published their results in Nature. In the same year, in collaboration with Lou Siminovitch, a trailblazer for molecular biology in Canada, they obtained evidence that these same marrow cells were capable of self-renewal, a crucial aspect of the functional definition of stem cells that they had formulated.

In 1969, Till became a Fellow of the Royal Society of Canada.

Later career 
In the 1980s Till's focus shifted, moving gradually into evaluation of cancer therapies, quality of life issues, and Internet research, including Internet research ethics and the ethics of List mining.

Till holds the distinguished title of University Professor Emeritus at the University of Toronto.

Recently, Till has been a vocal proponent of open access to scientific publications.

Until 2019, Till was an editorial member of the open access journal Journal of Medical Internet Research.

Till was a founding member of the Board of Directors of the Canadian Stem Cell Foundation (no longer active).

Honours 
1969, he and Ernest A. McCulloch were awarded the Canada Gairdner International Award
1993, awarded Robert L. Noble Prize by the National Cancer Institute of Canada, now the research arm of the Canadian Cancer Society
1994, made an Officer of the Order of Canada
2000, made a Fellow of the Royal Society of London
2004, inducted into the Canadian Medical Hall of Fame
2005, he and Ernest A. McCulloch were awarded the Albert Lasker Award for Basic Medical Research
2006, made a member of Order of Ontario
2018, awarded Edogawa-NICHE Prize

Selected publications

External links 
 
Canadian Medical Hall of Fame entry
James Till CV, Community of Science
Joint publications by Till and McCulloch, 1961-1969; full text courtesy University of Toronto
Follow Jim Till on twitter
James E. Till archival papers held at the University of Toronto Archives and Records Management Services
U of Toronto researcher James Till receives International Honour
Inaugural Edogawa NICHE Prize awarded to Prof James Till

1931 births
Living people
Canadian medical researchers
Cancer researchers
Canadian Fellows of the Royal Society
Fellows of the Royal Society of Canada
Members of the Order of Ontario
Officers of the Order of Canada
Stem cell researchers
University of Saskatchewan alumni
People from Lloydminster
Recipients of the Albert Lasker Award for Basic Medical Research
Yale University alumni
Canadian biophysicists
20th-century Canadian scientists
21st-century Canadian scientists
Scientists from Saskatchewan